Ash Fork Station is a former railway station of the Atchison, Topeka and Santa Fe Railway, located in Ash Fork, Yavapai County, Arizona. The large and 'grand' Harvey House Escalante Hotel and restaurant were part of the station complex.

Service to Ash Fork began in the early 1880s when the Atlantic and Pacific Railroad (predecessor of the Santa Fe) built through town, then in the Arizona Territory. After the completion of a line in 1895—the Santa Fe, Prescott and Phoenix Railway—to Phoenix, Ash Fork became an important junction point for the Santa Fe.

History
The first station in Ash Fork was an 1893 structure made out of red Coconino sandstone, and built in the same style as the current Flagstaff station. The structure was one of the first built by the railroad and became too small to handle the number of passengers at Ash Fork. It was destroyed in a 1905 fire.

Built in 1907, the second station was built as part of the famous Escalante hotel and restaurant. It was one of the renowned Fred Harvey Company rail passenger Harvey House complexes, built after the founder Fred Harvey died. The cost of construction was $150,000 (equivalent to $ in  adjusted for inflation). Ash Fork was a restaurant stop Harvey House, all passenger trains stopped so travelers could eat in the Escalante Dining Room or at the Lunch Counter, and shop in the Escalante's Indian Gift Shop.

Decline and closure
The Escalante Harvey House closed in 1948.

Ash Fork Station's service on the Southern Transcon main line lasted until December 1960, when the Santa Fe completed a bypass around Ash Fork. This was done to avoid the steep Johnson Canyon, west of Ash Fork. The junction point shifted to Williams Junction and the line to Phoenix became the only service through the town. The former main line west of Ash Fork was abandoned. This, combined with I-40 bypassing the town, began the decline of Ash Fork.

The final regular passenger service to Ash Fork ended in April 1969, when train number 42, the Hassayampa Flyer, was discontinued. The Escalante Harvey House building was demolished in the 1960s. The former freight house is the only still standing structure on the site.

Gallery

See also
Santa Fe, Prescott and Phoenix Railway
Phoenix Subdivision (BNSF Railway)
U.S. Route 66 in Arizona

References

Atchison, Topeka and Santa Fe Railway stations in Arizona
Atchison, Topeka and Santa Fe Railway hotels
Buildings and structures in Yavapai County, Arizona
Fred Harvey Company
Former railway stations in Arizona
History of Yavapai County, Arizona
Hotels in Arizona
Transportation in Yavapai County, Arizona
Railway stations in the United States opened in 1893
1893 establishments in Arizona Territory
Hotels established in 1907
Railway stations in the United States opened in 1907

1907 establishments in Arizona Territory
Railway stations closed in 1969
Demolished hotels in the United States
Demolished railway stations in the United States